This is a list of notable Danish Americans, including both original immigrants who obtained American citizenship and their American-born descendants.

To be included in this list, the person must have a Wikipedia article showing they are Danish American or must have references showing they are Danish American and are notable.

List

Actors

 Jessica Alba, actress, mother is of part Danish descent
 Bridgette Andersen, actress
 Robert Anderson, actor, make-up artist and director
 Gwili Andre, actress, immigrant from Denmark
 Earl W. Bascom, actor, maternal grandfather was from Denmark 
 Rowan Blanchard, American actress
 Alexis Bledel, actress, paternal grandfather of Danish descent
 Michael Bowen, actor, son of actress Sonia Sorel (née Henius), who is the daughter of Danish-American biochemist Max Henius
 Keith Carradine, actor, Danish maternal great-grandfather Max Henius, Danish maternal great-grandmother the sister of historian Johan Ludvig Heiberg
 Robert Carradine, actor, brother of actor Keith Carradine
 Erika Christensen, actress, father is of part Danish descent
 Hayden Christensen, actor, father is part Danish
 Tove Christensen, producer and actor, father is part Danish
 Ellen Corby, actress, maiden name was Hansen
 Jamie Lee Curtis, actress, maternal grandmother was born to Danish immigrants
 Kelly Curtis, actress, sister of actress Jamie Lee Curtis
 Karl Dane, comedian and actor 
 Eliza Dushku, actress, mother is of mostly Danish descent
 Buddy Ebsen, actor, father was of Danish ancestry
 Ann Forrest, actress, immigrant from Denmark
 Lilie Hayward, actress and screenwriter, sister of Danish American actress Seena Owen
 Jean Hersholt, actor, immigrant from Denmark
 Maren Jensen, actress and model, father was of Danish ancestry
 Scarlett Johansson, actress, father is an immigrant from Denmark
 Ashley Johnson, actress and voice actress
 Janet Leigh, actress, mother (Helen Westergaard), was born to Danish immigrants
 Deanna Lund, actress 
 Michael Madsen, actor, father was of Danish ancestry
 Virginia Madsen, actress, father was of Danish ancestry
 John Melendez, entertainer
 Kristine Miller, actress
 Viggo Mortensen, actor, father is from Denmark
 Brigitte Nielsen, Danish-born actress
 Leslie Nielsen, Danish father
 Connie Nielsen, actress
 Nica Noelle, pornographic film actress/director (father)
Mary-Kate and Ashley Olsen, fashion designers and former actresses (father is of partial Danish and partial Norwegian descent)
 Merlin Olsen, actor
 Susan Olsen, actress
 William Orlamond, actor, immigrant from Denmark
 Heather O'Rourke (1975–1988), child actress, mother is of Danish descent
 Seena Owen, actress, parents were immigrants from Denmark
 William Petersen, actor, paternal grandfather was of Danish ancestry
 Anders Randolf, actor, immigrant from Denmark 
 AnnaSophia Robb, actress, one or two of her great-grandmothers were Danes
 Bodil Rosing (1877–1941), Danish-born actress who had roles in both silent and talkie Hollywood films
 Peter Sarsgaard, actor, paternal great-great-grandparents were born in Denmark
 Gale Sondergaard, actress
 Amandla Stenberg, actress, Danish father 
 Sven-Ole Thorsen, actor and stuntman, immigrant from Denmark
 Uma Thurman, actress, mother is of partial Danish descent
 Vanessa Trump, actress and former model, mother of Danish origin
 Betty White, actress, Danish paternal grandfather
 Elijah Wood, American actor, maternal great-grandmother was of Danish ancestry
 Moon Zappa, actress, mother is of partial Danish ancestry

Architects
 Jens Jensen, landscape architect

Artists
 Earl W. Bascom, painter and sculptor of the American and Canadian West, "Cowboy of Cowboy Artists", "Dean of Canadian Cowboy Artists"
 Gutzon Borglum, sculptor of Mount Rushmore
 Solon Borglum, sculptor of the American West
 C. C. A. Christensen, painter
 Floyd Gottfredson, cartoonist, creator of The Phantom Blob and Eega Beeva in the Mickey Mouse universe
 Christian Gullager, painter
 Antonio Jacobsen, maritime painter
 George Jensen, painter
 Eric Larson, animator
 Ib Penick, paper engineer
 Ferdinand Richardt, landscape painter
Olaf Wieghorst, painter, "Dean of Western Art"

Athletics
 Chris "Birdman" Andersen, NBA player, father was a Danish immigrant
 Morten Andersen, NFL kicker
 Thomas William Asmussen, Major League Baseball catcher
 Earl W. Bascom, rodeo pioneer, rodeo champion, rodeo hall of fame inductee, "Father of Modern Rodeo"
 Julia Boserup, tennis player, Danish parents
 Jay DeMerit, professional soccer player
 Niko Hansen, professional soccer player
 Jim Jensen, football player
 Vern Mikkelsen, basketball player
 Colonel Thomas Hoyer Monstery, fencing and boxing master
 Battling Nelson, professional boxing world lightweight champion 1905–06, 1908–10
 Greg Olsen, football player
 Merlin Olsen, football player for Los Angeles Rams, Pro Football Hall of Fame inductee, older brother to Orrin and Phil 
 Orrin Olsen, football player for Kansas City Chiefs
 Phil Olsen, football player for L.A. Rams, Denver Broncos and the Buffalo Bills
 Anton Peterlin, soccer player
 Henrik Rummel, Danish-born olympic rower
 Reed Sorenson, NASCAR driver
 Noah Syndergaard, current MLB pitcher for the New York Mets
 Alan Voskuil, basketball player for the Danish national team
 Kid Williams, professional boxing world bantamweight champion 1914–17

Journalism

 Jack Anderson, journalist
 Chris Hansen, television journalist
 Sophus Frederik Neble, Danish born editor of Den Danske Pioneer
 Jacob Riis, Danish born journalist

Music

 Peter Blegvad, musician
 Victor Borge, musician and comedian
 Julian Casablancas, The Strokes vocalist
 Mose Christensen, symphony conductor
 Alf Clausen, film and television composer
 King Diamond, King Diamond lead vocalist
 Lars Frederiksen, Rancid vocalist and guitarist
 Dinah Jane, member of Fifth Harmony
 Taylor Hanson, musician
 Zac Hanson, musician
 Otto Harbach, lyricist
 Gunnar Johansen, pianist and composer
 Morten Lauridsen, composer
 Lauritz Melchior, opera singer
 M. P. Møller, pipe organ builder
 Rick Nielsen, Cheap Trick guitarist 
 Oh Land (Nanna Øland), singer-songwriter
 Iggy Pop, singer-songwriter
 Matthew Santos, rock and folk singer-songwriter, musician and painter, mother Danish-born
 Tinashe, singer 
 Mike Tramp, singer-songwriter
 Lars Ulrich, Metallica drummer
 Eddie Vedder, Pearl Jam singer-songwriter

Politics and law

 Lloyd Bentsen, former Democratic senator from Texas, Treasury Secretary, and vice presidential nominee
 Marius Dueholm, Danish born American farmer and politician
 Hans Peter Mareus Neilsen Gammel, author of The Laws of Texas 1822-1897
 Newt Gingrich, former Republican Congressman from Georgia from 1979 to 1999, and Speaker of the House from 1995 to 1999.
 Leo Hoegh, Decorated U.S. Army officer, lawyer, and politician who served as the 33rd Governor of Iowa from 1955 to 1957
 Steny Hoyer, House Minority Whip and former House Majority Leader
 Roger Jepsen, former Republican senator from Iowa
 Jo Jorgensen, Libertarian vice presidential candidate of 1996, and presidential candidate of 2020. 
 Chris Madsen, United States Marshals Service
 Janet Reno, Attorney General
 Ted Sorensen, speechwriter and president advisor
 Lis Wiehl, Fox News legal analyst and author

Religious personalities
 Anton Marius Andersen, founding President of Trinity Seminary at Dana College
 Kristian Anker, first president of the combined Trinity Seminary and Dana College
 Gottlieb Bender Christiansen, founding President of the United Evangelical Lutheran Church
 Claus Lauritz Clausen, first President of the Conference of the Norwegian-Danish Evangelical Lutheran Church of America
 Theodore Marcus Hansen, President of Dana College and Trinity Seminary
 Kristian Ostergaard, Lutheran pastor, educator and author
 Peter Sørensen Vig, President and Professor of Theology at Trinity Seminary at Dana College
 Russell M. Nelson, heart surgeon; President of the Church of Jesus Christ of Latter-day Saints
 D. Todd Christofferson, member of the Quorum of the Twelve Apostles, the Church of Jesus Christ of Latter-day Saints
 Neil L. Andersen, member of the Quorum of the Twelve Apostles, the Church of Jesus Christ of Latter-day Saints
 Ronald A. Rasband, member of the Quorum of the Twelve Apostles, the Church of Jesus Christ of Latter-day Saints

Science
 Jens Clausen, evolutionary biologist
 Erik Erikson, psychologist
 Niels Ebbesen Hansen, Head of the Horticultural Department at South Dakota State University
 William Webster Hansen, physicist and one of the founders of microwave electronics technology
 Max Henius, biochemist and founder of the Rebild National Park in Denmark
 Theo Holm, botanist
 Christine Korsgaard, philosopher
 Otto Larsen, sociologist known for academic work in mass hysteria and public positions on obscenity and pornography
 Dale T. Mortensen, economist
 Holger Thiele, astronomer

Writers
 Poul Anderson, science fiction author
 Erik Christian Haugaard, author of children's books
 Axel Madsen, writer
 Ib Melchior, Danish born film director, science fiction author and screenwriter
 Joel Skousen, American author
 Mark Skousen, American economist and author
 Royal Skousen, American professor
 W. Cleon Skousen, American author
 Brad Torgersen, science fiction author
 Sophus Keith Winther, professor and novelist

Other
 Jeff Bezos, founder of Amazon, biological father Ted Jorgensen, son of Danish immigrants
 Alma de Bretteville Spreckels, philanthropist
 John Wayne Gacy (1942–1994), serial killer
 Robert Hansen (1939-2014), serial killer known as the "Butcher Baker".
 Peter L. Jensen, engineer, inventor and entrepreneur and co-creator of the first moving-coil loudspeaker
 Johnson Outboards was founded by the Johnson brothers. Their father, Soren, was born in Denmark.
 Semon Knudsen, executive with Ford Motor Company and General Motors
 William S. Knudsen, Lieutenant general and executive with Ford Motor Company and General Motors
 Christian Mortensen, Danish-born supercentenarian, was longest-lived man on record at the time of his death
 Arthur Nielsen, American market analyst of Danish descent who founded the ACNielsen company and Nielsen Media Research, best known for the Nielsen ratings
 George Nissen, inventor of the trampoline, was the son of Danish immigrants
 Charles E. Sorensen, production engineer and executive with Ford Motor Company
 Claus von Bülow, Danish-born socialite accused of killing his wife Sunny

References

Danish Americans

Americans
Danish